Barra do Turvo is a municipality in the state of São Paulo in Brazil.

Conservation

The municipality contains part of the  Rio Turvo State Park, created in 2008. It contains 97% of the  Planalto do Turvo Environmental Protection Area, created at the same time. It contains the  Rio Pardinho e Rio Vermelho Environmental Protection Area. It contains part of the  Caverna do Diabo State Park, also created in 2008. The municipality contains 3% of the  Quilombos do Médio Ribeira Environmental Protection Area, established in 2008. It contains the  Pinheirinhos Sustainable Development Reserve, also created in 2008. It contains the  Barreiro/Anhemas Sustainable Development Reserve, created at the same time.

References

Sources

Municipalities in São Paulo (state)